This is a list of public housing authorities in Pennsylvania.

References

Public housing in Pennsylvania
Government of Pennsylvania
Pennsylvania-related lists